{{Infobox KHL team
| team   = Bulldogs Liège
| colour     = background:#FFFFFF; border-top:#0D2240 5px solid; border-bottom:#C32038 5px solid;
| colour text= #000000
| logo      = Bulldogs Liege logo.png
| logosize  = 230px
| name2   = 
| nickname   = 
| founded    = 1997
| folded  = 
| city   = Liège, Belgium
| arena      = Patinoire de Liège
| capacity   = 1250
| league     = BeNe League2015-presentBelgian Hockey League
2006-2015BelgianCup| division   = 
| conference = 
| uniform    = 
| colours    = Navy, red, white  
| owner      = 
| gm         = 
| coach = Paul Vincent 
| ass_coach  = Jac Scholtes
| ass_coach2 =
| captain    = Jordan Paulus
| president  = Olivier De Vriendt
| affiliates = 
| website    = Bulldogs Liège
| current    = 

| name1       =  Bulldogs Liège
| dates1      = 1997 - Present
}}Bulldogs de Liège''' is a Belgian ice hockey team playing in the BeNe League. They play their home games at Patinoire de Liège in Liège.

Season results

References

External links
 Official Site 

BeNe League (ice hockey) teams
Ice hockey teams in Belgium
Sport in Liège